Elorm Kabu Amenyah (born 1 August 1992) professionally known as $pacely (pronounced Spacely) is a Ghanaian rapper and singer. He is a member of trap music collective La Meme Gang. He has collaborated with Kwesi Arthur, Nxwrth, RJZ, Pappy Kojo, Kiddblack, KwakuBS, Kofi Mole and Darkovibes. He released his debut EP Fine$$e or Be Fine$$ed in 2019, which features songs like "Somimu" and "Uber" featuring Cina Soul and Joey B. respectively.

Early life and career 
Upon relocating to Ghana in 2012, he formed a music group in high school with friend Art Soul Kojo, who is now a painter and an artist. $pacely is called the Ad-lib King by his peers and Keanu- a moniker he gained for his very popular song "Digits".

In 2016, $pacely met young Ghanaian Producer Kuvie. This led to the recording of his debut single "Love on Drugs". The single featured and was produced by now members of La Meme Gang- Darkovibes and Nxwrth.

Spending much time together in the creative tutelage of Villain Sounds studio formed a bond between him and five other musicians which led to the creation of the La Meme Gang collective.  The name which translates as 'The Same Gang' was coined by $pacely.  After the release of their debut EP, they secured four nominations at the 2019 Vodafone Ghana music Awards.

In 2017, $pacely released 'Digits', a heavy trap Nxwrth produced song. A remix to the song was later released which featured Ghanaian rapper Kwesi Arthur.

Alongside his La Meme Gang members, $pacely was featured in a Boiler Room documentary which spoke about the rich history of Ghanaian Culture and also sealed Boiler Room performance.

Discography

EP 
2019: Fine$$e or Be Fine$$ed

Singles 
 2019: Yawa
 2019: Yenkodi
 2018: Dit Moi
 2017: Digits (Remix)
 2017: Digits
 2017: Ikechukwu
 2017: Bad
 2017: Scandalous
 2017: Love on Drugs

Features

Albums 
 2018: La Même Gang- Linksters
 2017: La Même Gang- La Même Tape

Singles 
 2019: Tulenkey- Little Soldiers
 2019: Pappy Kojo- Blessing
 2018: Joey B- Stables
 2018: R2Bees - Boys Kasa
 2018: Sarkodie- Homicide
 2017: Joey B- Rock The Boat
 2017: Magnom- Bam Bam

Videography

References 

1992 births
Living people
21st-century Ghanaian singers
Ghanaian musicians